Piet De Bruyn (born 2 April 1968 in Hasselt, Limburg) is a Belgian politician and is affiliated to the New Flemish Alliance (N-VA). He is member of the Flemish Parliament since February 2013, having previously been MFP between December 2007 and June 2009. He has also been senator between October 2010 and February 2013.

He is also a council member in the municipality of Rotselaar following the 2012 local elections.

He is active regarding human rights and LGBT rights in Belgium.

Notes

1968 births
Living people
People from Hasselt
New Flemish Alliance politicians
Members of the Flemish Parliament
Belgian LGBT politicians
Members of the Senate (Belgium)
21st-century Belgian politicians